Joseph Ovide Brouillard (January 17, 1859  March 3, 1940) was a Canadian politician and businessman. He was elected to the House of Commons of Canada as a Member of the Liberal Party in the 1911 election to represent the riding of Drummond—Arthabaska. He was re-elected in the 1917 election and joined the Laurier Liberals March 18, 1918.

External links
 

1859 births
1940 deaths
Laurier Liberals
Liberal Party of Canada MPs
Members of the House of Commons of Canada from Quebec